Steven Michael Lukes  (born 1941) is a British political and social theorist. Currently he is a professor of politics and sociology at New York University. He was formerly a professor at the University of Siena, the European University Institute (Florence) and the London School of Economics.

Life and career
Lukes attended the Royal Grammar School in Newcastle upon Tyne, completing his studies there in 1958. Lukes completed his BA in 1962 at Balliol College, Oxford. He worked as a research fellow at Nuffield College and as a lecturer in politics at Worcester College and completed his MA in 1967. In 1968, he completed his doctorate on the work of Émile Durkheim. From 1966 to 1987, he was fellow and tutor in politics at Balliol College. He is a Fellow of the British Academy (FBA) and a visiting professor at the University of Paris, New York University, University of California, San Diego, and Hebrew University.

From 1974 to 1983, he was President of the Committee for the History of Sociology of the International Sociological Association. He was the co-director of the European Forum on Citizenship at the European University Institute from 1995 to 1996.

In April 2006, Lukes married the political commentator and author Katha Pollitt, this being his third marriage. Lukes was previously a widower. He has three children from his previous marriage to the English barrister Nina Stanger.

Academic interests

Lukes' main interests are political and social theory, the sociology of Durkheim and his followers, individualism, rationality, the category of the person, Marxism and ethics, sociology of morality and new forms of liberalism, varieties of conceptions of power, the notion of the "good society", rationality and relativism, moral conflict and politics.

He is a member of the editorial board of the European Journal of Sociology and directs a research project on what is left of the socialist idea in Western and Eastern Europe.

The three dimensions of power

One of Lukes' academic theories is that of the "three faces of power," presented in his book, Power: A Radical View. This theory claims that power is exercised in three ways: decision-making power, non-decision-making power, and ideological power.

Decision-making power is the most public of the three dimensions. Analysis of this "face" focuses on policy preferences revealed through political action.

Non-decision-making power is that which sets the agenda in debates and makes certain issues (e.g., the merits of socialism in the United States) unacceptable for discussion in "legitimate" public forums. Adding this face gives a two-dimensional view of power allowing the analyst to examine both current and potential issues, expanding the focus on observable conflict to those types that might be observed overtly or covertly.

Ideological power allows one to influence people's wishes and thoughts, even making them want things opposed to their own self-interest (e.g., causing women to support a patriarchal society). Lukes offers this third dimension as a "thoroughgoing critique" of the behavioural focus of the first two dimensions, supplementing and correcting the shortcomings of previous views, allowing the analyst to include both latent and observable conflicts. Lukes claims that a full critique of power should include both subjective interests and those "real" interests held by those excluded by the political process.

Selected works

Books

References

External links

Official website

1941 births
Living people
Academics of the London School of Economics
Academic staff of the European University Institute
Alumni of Balliol College, Oxford
British sociologists
Place of birth missing (living people)
Fellows of Balliol College, Oxford
Fellows of the British Academy
New York University faculty
British social sciences writers
Academic staff of the University of Siena
British political philosophers